Varzobqala is a village and jamoat in Tajikistan. It is located in Varzob District, one of the Districts of Republican Subordination. The jamoat has a total population of 11,438 (2015). Villages: Beghar, Varzob, Varzobqal'a, Dashti Rinjon, Zimchurud, Kondara, Pughuze, Rabot, Fanfaroq, Khoja Obi Garm, Shafti Mijgon, Ghazhne, Ghusgharf, Hushyori, Jirino.

References

Populated places in Districts of Republican Subordination
Jamoats of Tajikistan